Frontier of the Stars is a lost 1921 American drama silent film directed by Charles Maigne and written by Charles Maigne and Albert Payson Terhune. The film stars Thomas Meighan, Faire Binney, Alphonse Ethier, Edward Ellis, Gus Weinberg and Florence Johns. The film was released January 20, 1921, by Paramount Pictures.

Cast 
Thomas Meighan as Buck Leslie
Faire Binney as Hilda Shea
Alphonse Ethier as Phil Hoyt 
Edward Ellis as Gregory
Gus Weinberg as Ganz
Florence Johns as Mary Hoyt

References

External links 
 
 

1921 films
1920s English-language films
Silent American drama films
1921 drama films
Paramount Pictures films
Films directed by Charles Maigne
American black-and-white films
American silent feature films
Lost American films
1921 lost films
Lost drama films
1920s American films